This is a list of public art in the Metropolitan Borough of Walsall, in the West Midlands, England. This list applies only to works of public art accessible in an outdoor public space. For example, this does not include artwork visible inside a museum.

Walsall

Town Centre

Market Place

Saddlers Shopping Centre

Walsall Arboretum

Bescot

Bloxwich

Brownhills

Willenhall

References 

Walsall
Walsall